__NoTOC__
The 1984 Australian referendum was held on 1 December 1984. It contained two referendum questions, neither of which passed. As of 2022, this is the last referendum in which any state voted in favor of a constitutional amendment.

The referendum was held in conjunction with the 1984 federal election.

Results in detail

Terms of Senators
This section is an excerpt from 1984 Australian referendum (Terms of Senators) § Results

Interchange of Powers
This section is an excerpt from 1984 Australian referendum (Interchange of Powers) § Results

See also
Referendums in Australia
Politics of Australia
History of Australia

References

Further reading
  
 .
 Australian Electoral Commission (2007) Referendum Dates and Results 1906 – Present AEC, Canberra.

1984 referendums
1984
Referendum
December 1984 events in Australia